Ákos Seper (born 22 July 1979, in Hungary) is a Hungarian football player.

References 
playerhistory

1979 births
Living people
Hungarian footballers
Hungarian expatriate footballers
Szombathelyi Haladás footballers
Aris Limassol FC players
APEP FC players
Digenis Akritas Morphou FC players
Omonia Aradippou players
Cypriot First Division players
Cypriot Second Division players
Expatriate footballers in Cyprus
Association football defenders